Chendek (Çendek) is a rural locality (a selo) and the administrative centre of Chendekskoye Rural Settlement, Ust-Koksinsky District, the Altai Republic, Russia. The population was 870 as of 2016. There are 27 streets.

Geography 
Chendek is located 29 km east of Ust-Koksa (the district's administrative centre) by road. Bashtala is the nearest rural locality.

References 

Rural localities in Ust-Koksinsky District